North Clay High School, also called Louisville-North Clay or just Louisville, is a public high school serving students in grades 9-12 in northern Clay County, Illinois, USA. It is the only high school in the North Clay Unit School District #25.

Athletics

The school offers baseball (fall and spring), Girls softball, volleyball, Boys and Girls basketball and cross country. The school competes in the IHSA as part of the Midland Trail conference.

School song
Rally sons of North Clay High
Sing her glory up to the sky
Rally Cheer her color's true and cheer her team on through
Rah, rah for North Clay High

Cheer, cheer for ole North Clay High
Wake up the echoes, victory is nigh
Send the rally cheer on high
Shake down the thunder from the sky.

Although our odds be great or small
Ole North Clay High will win over all
While our Loyal Sons are marching onward to victory.

(Repeat from Cheer, cheer for ole North Clay High)

(After the second time through the cheerleaders yell:)

Cha ha, Cha ha, Cha ha ha ha
North Clay Cardinals
Rah, Rah, Rah

References

External links
NCHS website
NCCUSD #25 website
greatschools North Clay High School

Public high schools in Illinois
Education in Clay County, Illinois
Schools in Clay County, Illinois